Stichaeus is a genus of marine ray-finned fishes belonging to the family Stichaeidae, the pricklebacks or shannies. These fishes are mainly found in the North Pacific Ocean with one species in the Arctic and western North Atlantic Oceans.

Taxonomy
Stichaeus was first proposed as a monospecific genus in 1836 by the Danish zoologist Johan Reinhardt with Blennius punctatus, which was described by Johan Christian Fabricius in 1780 from western Greenland, designated as the type species. This genus is classified within the subfamily Stichaeinae of the Zoarcoid family Stichaeidae.

Species  
Stichaeus contains 6 extant species and 2 known extinct species, as follows:

† means extinct

Etymology
The genus name, Stichaeus means "to set in a row", and is presumed to refer to the row of 5 or 6 circular spots on the dorsal fin.

Characteristics
Stichaeus species have moderately elongated, laterally compressed bodies which are covered in tiny cycloid scales, although the head is scaleless. There are teeth on the jaws, vomer and palatine. The teeth on the upper jaw are arranged in between two and four rows while those in the lower jaw form a single row. The jaws are equal in length or the lower jaw may just protrude beyond the upper jaw. The head has a number of sensory canals which are made up of pores and are used to sense vibrations. The single lateral line does not reach the caudal fin and appears to be an extension of the post orbital sensory canal. The anal fin has no rear spines.

Distribution and habitat
Stichaeus fishes are largely found in the northwestern Pacific vut one species, S. punctatus extends into the western Arctic Ocean and the north western Atlantic Ocean.

References

Stichaeinae